Sabanov is a Russian language surname. Notable people with the name include:

 Erol Sabanov (born 1974), Bulgarian-German football goalkeeper
 Ivan Sabanov (born 1992), Serbian tennis player
 Matej Sabanov (born 1992), Serbian tennis player

Russian-language surnames